"Thank you" (often expanded to  thank you very much or thanks a lot, or informally abbreviated to thanks or alternately as many thanks) is a common expression of gratitude in the English language. The term itself originated as a shortened form of the expression "I thank you".

As with various other formal phrases, "[t]he phrase 'Thank you' can be varied in speaking so as to convey many different meanings". For example, "no, thank you" or "no thanks" are often used to indicate politeness while declining an offer. It can also be incorporated into phrases sarcastically or bitterly, as with the phrase, "thanks for nothing". Common responses for "thank you" include "you're welcome", "don't mention it", or, more recently, "no problem".

Learning to use the term
Use of the phrase indicates politeness, and in certain Western cultures, "parents put a lot of effort into teaching their children to be polite, to say 'thank you' or 'please' for every single favor done by anyone", though the practice of quizzing children on what they should say has been criticized as framing the question in a negative context of the child being forgetful, and that the parent should merely remind the child to "Say please and thank you".  It has generally been observed that "parents train their kids to say 'thank you' whether they feel thankful or not", and has specifically been noted that withholding food from children in order to elicit politeness "may teach children that the words 'please' and 'thank you' are tokens they must use to get their food rather than genuine expressions of gratitude".

Social function
Philosopher David J. Gunkel notes that "[i]t is now common for users to say 'thank you' to their digital assistants and speech dialogue systems (SDS), like Amazon's Echo/Alexa, Google Home, and Apple's Siri". Gunkel notes that this may appear to be superfluous, since the statement neither offers information to the system for processing, nor is capable of being processed by the system and understood as a command, but concludes that it is nevertheless socially important because it recognizes the system as fulfilling a social function.

Use of the phrase by teachers has been observed to elicit better responses in the teaching of children:

In other environs, one study found that regular patrons of a restaurant gave bigger tips when servers wrote "Thank you" on their checks.

Cultural variations
A wide variety of verbal cues for the expression of gratitude exist in different languages. A 2012 Vanity Fair poll indicated that "thank you" was the phrase American travelers abroad felt was most important phrase to learn how to say in the language of the country being visited.

It has been observed that in some versions of African English (specifically in Kenyan English), "thank you" is often used as a traditional response to a departing person saying "goodbye".

See also
 Deo gratias, Latin phrase meaning "thanks [be] to God"
 God bless you

References

External links

English phrases
Etiquette
Magic words